VIII Prywatne Akademickie Liceum Ogólnokształcące of Kraków (English: Private Academic High School No 8 of Kraków) is a high school in Kraków, Poland. The school was established in 1993 under the name VIII Prywatne Liceum Ogólnokształcące (Private High School No 8) and has existed with the current name since 2004. Jerzy Waligóra is the founder of the school. The school offers an IB Diploma Programme. The school cooperates with Krakow's universities implementing joint educational programmes.

Bibliography

External links 
 Oficjalna witryna internetowa szkoły

Education in Kraków
Educational institutions established in 1993
1993 establishments in Poland